Joseph L. Chillo, Jr. is an American college administrator and professor. He is the 15th president of Thomas More University. Chillo was the president of Newbury College from 2014 until its closure in 2019. He is a professor of humanities and American history.

Education 
Chillo was a first-generation college student. He earned a Bachelor of Arts at Binghamton University and a master of public administration from Long Island University. He completed a doctor of law and policy at Northeastern University in 2014.

Career 
Chillo was the executive director of enrollment services at St. Thomas Aquinas College. He served as the vice president for enrollment and college relations at Colby–Sawyer College and the vice president for enrollment management at Wheelock College. In 2011, Chillo became the executive vice president of Newbury College. He became the fifth and final president of Newbury in June 2014. He also worked was a professor of humanities and taught courses on American history.

On May 1, 2019, Chillo was named president of Thomas More University.

References

Living people
Year of birth missing (living people)
Binghamton University alumni
Long Island University alumni
Northeastern University alumni
St. Thomas Aquinas College faculty
Colby–Sawyer College faculty
Wheelock College faculty
Newbury College (United States)
Heads of universities and colleges in the United States
20th-century American people
21st-century American educators
Thomas More University people
American humanities academics